José Antonio Salguero García (born 25 January 1960) is a Spanish retired footballer who played as a central defender.

In La Liga, he played almost exclusively with Real Madrid (six seasons) and Sevilla (five), winning six major titles with the former. His professional career lasted 17 years.

Club career
Born in Fuente de Piedra, Province of Málaga, Salguero started playing professionally with hometown's CD Málaga, making his La Liga debut in 1979–80 in a relegation-ending campaign. In the subsequent off-season he signed for Real Madrid, but spent almost two entire years with the reserves, being nonetheless part of the squad that won the 1982 Copa del Rey.

Salguero only managed to start regularly for Madrid in 1986–87, playing 28 matches – and partnering legendary Manuel Sanchís in the heart of the back-four – as the club won the national championship. Previously, he was relatively used in back-to-back UEFA Cup conquests, and left in 1987 with more than 100 official appearances to his credit.

Subsequently, Salguero played five seasons with Sevilla FC, rarely missing one game for the Andalusians. In his third year they managed to finish sixth and qualify to the UEFA Cup, being ousted in the second round by Russian side FC Torpedo Moscow.

Aged 32, Salguero moved to Segunda División and signed with CP Mérida, appearing in 104 league matches during his three-year spell and helping the Extremadura team promote to the top division for the first time ever, in 1995. He retired with totals in the latter competition of 278 games and 21 goals over 12 seasons, and later worked in a law firm.

Honours
Real Madrid
La Liga: 1985–86, 1986–87
Copa del Rey: 1981–82; Runner-up 1982–83
Copa de la Liga: 1985
UEFA Cup: 1984–85, 1985–86
UEFA Cup Winners' Cup: Runner-up 1982–83
Supercopa de España: Runner-up 1982

Mérida
Segunda División: 1994–95

References

External links

1960 births
Living people
Sportspeople from the Province of Málaga
Spanish footballers
Footballers from Andalusia
Association football defenders
La Liga players
Segunda División players
CD Málaga footballers
Real Madrid Castilla footballers
Real Madrid CF players
Sevilla FC players
CP Mérida footballers
UEFA Cup winning players
Spain under-21 international footballers